Vanessa Annelyse Ève Garcin (born 25 August 1980 in Sète, Hérault, France), better known by her stage name Ève Angeli  is a French pop singer, who won an NRJ Music Award for Best New French Artist in 2000–2002.

Biography
She began her rise to fame on the television show Graines de star in 2010. Her star-making performance on the show led to a major-label recording contract with Sony Music and the eventual release of her debut single, "Avant de venir" in 2000. 
The lead single from her forthcoming full-length album debut, "Aime-Moi" (2002), "Avant de Partir" was a Top Five hit on the French singles chart. 
The follow-up single "Elle" was a major hit also, breaking into the Top Ten, and though successive singles "Je Sais" and "C'est Pour Ça" were less popular, the run of hit singles helped carry Aime-Moi to number 11 on the French albums chart.
In 2002 Angeli won the NRJ Music Award for Best New French Artist and released her second album, "Nos Différences", which spawned a modest hit with its title track, a bilingual collaboration with the British boy band A1. 
Relative to her debut album, however, "Nos Différences" was a disappointment and Angeli subsequently receded from the spotlight for a couple years. 
She re-emerged in 2004 with the reality TV show La Ferme Célébrités, a greatest-hits compilation "Le Meilleur d'Eve Angeli", and the new single "Une Chanson dans le Coeur," her biggest hit in years. Her third album, "Viens" (2005), followed, and while it spawned a couple modest hits with "Viens" and "Je Vais T'aimer," it continued to mark a downturn in Angeli's commercial success and concluded her association with Sony.

In subsequent years, Angeli published a book, Mes Evangélismes: Pensées d'une Blonde (2007), and released her first independent album, "Revolution" (2008).

Discography

Albums

Singles

References

See also
NRJ Music Awards
Artist's blog

1980 births
Living people
People from Sète
La Ferme Célébrités participants
Angeli, Eve
21st-century French singers
21st-century French women singers